The Letlhakane Coal Mine is a coal mine located in Central District. The mine has coal reserves amounting to 107 million tonnes of coking coal, one of the largest coal reserves in Africa and the world.

See also 
 List of mines in Botswana

References 

Coal mines in Botswana